Weston GO Station is a train station in Toronto, Ontario, serving the GO Transit Kitchener line and the Union Pearson Express.  It is located on the south side of Lawrence Avenue West, just east of Weston Road, in the neighbourhood of Weston.

Overview

Weston station consists of three tracks served by one side and one island platform, and a fourth track and side platform are under construction on the east side of station. Each platform has two sections: UP Express trains stop at high-level platforms at the north end of the station, while Kitchener Line trains stop at low-level platforms at the south end of the station. In addition to the Metrolinx-owned passenger rail tracks, the double-tracked Canadian Pacific MacTier Subdivision passes along the east side of the station.

The station is fully accessible, with pedestrian entrances from Weston Road and Lawrence Avenue and a pedestrian bridge across Lawrence Avenue. The station includes a kiss and ride passenger drop off area, and has a parking capacity for 220 cars.

Further station enhancements have been in process since 2019, and are expected to be completed in 2022. Once completed, the station will have an additional track and platform plus more customer parking.

History

Early stations
The first stations at this location were the Weston Stations of the Canadian National Railway (CNR) and Canadian Pacific Railway (CPR).

GTR Weston / CNR Weston
The CNR station was built in 1856 by the Grand Trunk Railway (GTR) south of John Street which was absorbed by the CNR in 1923.

CPR Weston
The Toronto, Grey and Bruce Railway (TG&B) went into service in 1871 on narrow gauge rail, which was converted to standard gauge track by 1881, and became part of the CPR in 1883. The CPR station was located on northside of John Street west of Rosemount Avenue, and was constructed circa 1900 replacing an earlier TG&B structure. The station last saw passenger service in 1957, and was subsequently used as an order office until its demolition in 1973.

Legacy
A Tim Hortons store on the south side of Lawrence Avenue West, east of the tracks, pays homage to the old stations with a replica "Weston" station sign on the roof.

First GO Station

The first Weston GO Station opened in 1974 and stretched north from Lawrence Avenue to John Street.  It consisted of a single track and platform accessed via a staircase and entrance from a headhouse on Lawrence Avenue west of the railway overpass. The station was demolished in October 2013 following the opening of the temporary GO platform.

A temporary platform was opened on July 23, 2013 on the south side of Lawrence Avenue and in use into 2014 pending construction of the new station. Ticket sales were moved to a temporary trailer until the new station was open.  This was part of the Georgetown South railway improvement project, which included eliminating all level crossings of the Kitchener Line in the City of Toronto. The original GO station on the north side of Lawrence Avenue was demolished in late 2013 in order to construct a ramp into the new tunnel under the Weston area and allow for the pedestrian bridge construction over Lawrence Avenue.

Current GO Station
As part of the Union Pearson Express project and Georgetown South expansion, construction on a new station commenced in August 2013. Completed in 2015, new station features many improvements over the previous station, such as more parking, more platforms, more tracks, heated shelters, enclosed entrances and space for future retail. The station building opened in June 2015 and parking facilities were completed by end of 2015.  A new pedestrian bridge opened in late October 2016 providing a means to cross Lawrence Avenue without having to walk over to either Weston Road or Ralph Street.

The initial plan for the airport rail link service to Pearson International Airport, Blue22, did not include a stop at Weston station.  However, in 2005, area residents campaigned for a stop on the service in 2005 as compensation for negative impacts of the railway expansion. Following the takeover of the project by Metrolinx, Weston became a stop on the planned service.  As a result, Weston has been a stop on the Union Pearson Express since the service began operation in June 2015.  UPX president Kathy Haley said that 10 per cent of UPX riders are expected to board at Weston GO Station.

Connections
There are no bus stops beside the station, but a short distance west at the intersection of Lawrence Avenue West and Weston Road, connections can be made to Toronto Transit Commission bus routes 52 Lawrence West, 79 Scarlett Road, 89 Weston, 952 Lawrence West Express and 989 Weston Express.

References

External links

The Weston Station master plan (2012) at GO Transit (archived March 3, 2016)

GO Transit railway stations
Railway stations in Toronto
Railway stations in Canada opened in 1974
1974 establishments in Ontario